Donatella Bulfoni (born 6 November 1959) is a retired Italian high jumper.

Biography
Her personal best jump was 1.91 metres, achieved in July 1981 in Bucharest.

Achievements

See also
Italian all-time top lists - High jump

References

External links
 

1959 births
Living people
Italian female high jumpers
Mediterranean Games silver medalists for Italy
Athletes (track and field) at the 1976 Summer Olympics
Athletes (track and field) at the 1979 Mediterranean Games
Mediterranean Games medalists in athletics
Olympic athletes of Italy